Craig Kinsey is an American trans-genre singer-songwriter and intellectual based in Houston, Texas, most commonly known for his wild bacchanalian stage shows. He is regarded as the ‘Godfather of the Houston Americana Music Scene.’ His theology and belief system began as a young man in the American south, taking him north to Canada before returning to a monastic life near Eureka Springs, Arkansas. Unexpected exposure to new musical experiences, most especially with instruction from John Michael Talbot, inspired his return to Houston. Eventually graduating magna cum laude from the University of Saint Thomas with a joint major in psychology and philosophy, his focus has come to rest on a career in music released by multiple Texas-based record labels. Noteworthy performances have seen him tour with Hayes Carll, open for acts such as Ian McLagan of Faces and Roky Erickson,  share the stage with musicians John Evans and Robert Ellis, and play just before Snoop Dogg at Houston's Free Press Summer Fest 2012.

History

Early life 
Craig Kinsey was born on July 12, 1971 in Richmond, Texas, though he was raised in Houston. Early family influence instilled in him a fascination with theology and the dynamic of the 1920s and '30s traveling hobo, an educated migrant working class concurrent with traveling revival tents of the era. This led to a youth spent in focused meditation, often fasting and camping for minimalist stretches in the woods around southeast Texas until around the age of nineteen.

A desire to connect with the mendicant lifestyle of the traveling holy philosopher lead to a hitchhiking expedition from Texas to Canada, singing and preaching along the way. More hitchhiking and train hopping eventually lead him back to Texas and to an increased interest in deepening his spirituality and connection to early American music.

Monastic life 
His return to the south prompted him to renew a commitment to exploring his spirituality. A search for an outlet to meditate in focus and solitude led to taking vows as a Catholic monk. He joined the Little Portion Hermitage just outside Eureka Springs, Arkansas, founded by Catholic singer/songwriter John Michael Talbot.

Kinsey would remain with the monastery for nearly five years, during which he learned much of American southern music, including the beginnings of country rock as practiced by John Michael Talbot and his time with Mason Proffit. He would eventually earn the right to travel into Eureka Springs on weekends, where he became acquainted with Melissa Carper of the Carper Family Band. Her friendship and particular brand of bluegrass performance would inform his growing desire to return to civilian life and further his musical and theological progress.

Eventually, Kinsey submitted an official request for release. After nearly five years in residence at the monastery, he was granted proper dispensation from the bishop and left for Houston to study at the University of Saint Thomas and start a band.

Education 
Kinsey enjoyed a fruitful experience during his four years at the University of Saint Thomas, earning a place on the Dean's List each year and eventually graduating Magne cum laude with a joint major in psychology and philosophy. He began limited participation with the theatre department, though mostly content to observe the differences in crowd dynamics and reactions night after night. It was during this time that he met Geoffrey Muller and Scott McNeil, beginning some informal session playing.

Musical work 
After considerable effort, these new acquaintances convinced Kinsey to take their newfound musical chemistry to a more public venue. The trio's time together ended up as a three-song open-mic appearance at a Montrose area bar called Helios (currently known as Avante Garden). Their first appearance inspired a nagging bartender to secure a weekly residency for the group; the growing interest attracted drummer Shane Lauder to start showing up and getting onstage with them. They began to refer to their weekly nights of bluegrass and classic blues and country cover songs as The Medicine Show, later settling on a separate moniker for the band itself, Sideshow Tramps. As original material began to surface in their regular sets, plans for recording got underway. In 2007, an album titled The Medicine Show was given a small release in Houston, documenting the group's early work.

His approach to life as the band's front man was a reflection of his time spent in solitude and meditation; rather than joining the general assembly of the venue, he would more commonly stay away in quiet meditation and chant. He had a particular lack of interest in the stereotypes associated with the common party lifestyles expected of musicians. He instead governed himself with the underlying feeling of wanting to return to that hermitage lifestyle of his monastery days. This tendency toward disassociation may have hampered early development, as he showed no interest toward financial growth of a music career. The juxtaposition of his pious, focused lifestyle against the raucous, evangelical performance earned him the nickname ‘The Reverend’ among the burgeoning local Americana/Gypsy Jazz scene.

By the following year, Kinsey had amassed a number of his own songs that deviated from the common feel of the band. The informal nature of the Sideshow Tramps made the development of material a slow process, so he decided a solo album was a better fit. Fellow University of Saint Thomas alumni Mike Whitebread funded a recording session that took place in an apartment in the Montrose neighborhood of Houston, led by now-Emmy award-winning engineer Steve Christensen. Kinsey released the album The Burdener in 2008 to much praise, cited by the Houston Chronicle as among the best Houston, if not Texas, releases of the year.

The strength of the release and growing fascination with the band's live show attracted the attention of W Ross Wells of Zenfilm and Dan Workman of Sugarhill Recording Studios. The pair had recently begun a joint effort aimed at releasing albums for promising local acts under the label Zenhill Records. In 2009, Craig Kinsey was signed to Zenhill Records to rerelease his solo album The Burdener, and work shortly began on producing a new Sideshow Tramps album. In 2011, Revelator was released on Zenhill Records as the last studio album from Sideshow Tramps before several of the band's core members followed various other musical engagements that prevented time intensive commitment to further band development. Kinsey continued to develop his own music and performance style on his own and with large revolving cast of supporting local and national musicians. Sideshow Tramps remain a supported regional favorite, with at least one more album in the works, a live performance from their Revelator heyday.

Around this time while still at work on 2011's Revelator, Grammy Award-winning Producer Steve Christensen posed the question, “How long have you known you were going to be a musician?” “About two weeks,” he replied. Having only ever focused on the direction of his spiritual and sociological pursuits, he'd refrained from following the life of a musician. This question forced the realization that musicianship was a ‘doorway to following the path to a higher calling.’

American roots and machines 
Kinsey would spend the next three years writing and recording his next solo album, American Roots and Machines. He began to abandon the traditional method of capturing initial tracks in a studio, choosing instead to have engineers capture on location in homes and rehearsal spaces where the creative sparks felt the strongest. The resulting album was released on July 26, 2014 with a performance at Fitzgerald's in Houston, Texas with several guests, including Dem Damn Dames, Kam Franklin, and Alicia Gianni of the Houston Grand Opera. Plans to support the album include a national tour booked around national parks, promoting a sense of camaraderie among the touring acts and saving money on lodging by spending as many nights and travel days camping in the wilderness as possible.

Influences 
Friedrich Nietzsche, Woody Guthrie, Bill Monroe, Tom Waits, Blind Lemon Jefferson

Other work 
Kinsey has frequently exercised his collaborative nature by being involved in the projects of friends and acquaintances. He had a supporting role in the 2011 cult indy horror film Honky Tonk Blood, produced by Hank Schyma and Johnny Falstaff. There is also archived live footage of Sideshow Tramps performances appearing in the film, as well as Kinsey's multiple appearances on the soundtrack.

Kinsey was involved in a 2011 art opening at the Houston Art Car Museum entitled Musicians Who Make Art. Multiple works of his visual art remained on display through the run of the show.

His newest album American Roots and Machines was the first release on Splice Records, a new endeavor of which he is a founding member. There are plans to expand in the future, including helping local bands to release material and tour nationally.

Work continues on a yet Unnamed novel with themes intertwined within the album American Roots and Machines. Kinsey has been developing it for many years, though developments through the creative process during AR&M has set it back somewhat. A target release date has yet to be announced.

References

External links 
 

Living people
People from Richmond, Texas
Musicians from Houston
1971 births